Cochlespira is a genus of sea snails, marine gastropod mollusks in the family Cochlespiridae.

Description
The species in this genus are characterized by their elongated fusiform spire and a long siphonal canal. The whorls show on their edge spinose projections.

The shell is moderate in size, with a subacute, few whorled, glassy protoconch. It has an elongated slender, straight siphonal canal.  The whorls are tabulated by a sharp recurved spinose or beaded keel, between which and the suture the surface is concave, nearly smooth. The anal sulcus is deep, narrow, the fasciole separated from the suture by a beaded ridge, the outer margin of the fasciole not elevated. Type  † Pleurotoma cristata Conrad, 1848. Oligocene fossil.

This group is extremely close to Ancistrosyrinx Dall, 1881, the latter differing only by having the anal sulcus at the suture, with no intervening ridge, while the outer margin of the fasciole has an elevated lamella between which and the reflected keel at the shoulder there is an excavated channel. These differences hold good between the Oligocene and the recent forms, so far known, without exception. The recent forms have an operculum like that of Leucosyrinx.

Distribution
Species from this genus occur in very deep water in the Indo-West Pacific and off Australia (Queensland).

Species
Species within the genus Cochlespira include:
 Cochlespira beuteli Powell, 1969
 Cochlespira bevdeynzerae Garcia, 2010
 Cochlespira cavalier Garcia, 2010
 Cochlespira cedonulli (Reeve, 1843)
 Cochlespira crispulata (Martens, 1901)
 Cochlespira elegans (Dall, 1881)
 Cochlespira elongata Simone, 1999
 † Cochlespira engonata Conrad, 1865 (extinct species from the Claibornean, Texas, USA) 
 Cochlespira kuroharai (Kuroda, 1959)
 Cochlespira laurettamarrae Garcia, 2010
 Cochlespira leeana Garcia, 2010
 † Cochlespira maorum (P. Marshall & R. Murdoch, 1923) 
 Cochlespira pulchella (Schepman, 1913)
 Cochlespira pulcherrissima (Kira, 1955)
 Cochlespira radiata (Dall, 1889)
 Cochlespira simillima Powell, 1969
 Cochlespira travancorica (Smith E. A., 1896)
 Cochlespira zanzibarica Sysoev, 1996

References

 Powell A.W.B. (1942). The New Zealand Recent and fossil Mollusca of the family Turridae with general notes on turrid nomenclature and systematics. Bulletin of the Auckland Institute and Museum. 2: 1-188, 14 pls.
 Powell, A.W.B. 1966. The molluscan families Speightiidae and Turridae, an evaluation of the valid taxa, both Recent and fossil, with list of characteristic species. Bulletin of the Auckland Institute and Museum. Auckland, New Zealand 5: 1-184, pls 1-23
 Powell, A.W.B. 1969. The family Turridae in the Indo-Pacific. Part. 2. The subfamily Turriculinae. Indo-Pacific Mollusca 2(10): 207-415, pls 188-324
 Long, D.C. 1981. Late Eocene and early Oligocene Turridae (Gastropoda: Prosobranchiata) of the Brown's Creek and Glen Aire Clays, Victoria, Australia. Memoirs of the National Museum of Victoria 42: 15-55 
 Wilson, B. 1994. Australian Marine Shells. Prosobranch Gastropods. Kallaroo, WA : Odyssey Publishing Vol. 2 370 pp.

External links